Marc Gopin, scholar and practitioner, is the director of the Center for World Religions, Diplomacy and Conflict Resolution (CRDC), and  James H. Laue Professor at the School of Conflict Analysis and Resolution at George Mason University Arlington, Virginia, USA. The Association of Conflict Resolution recently awarded Gopin The Peacemaker Award for his contribution to the Conflict Resolution Field. Note that, in 2008 he also received the Andrew Thomas Peacebuilder Award from the New York State Dispute Resolution Association (NYSDRA). Gopin has pioneered peacebuilding projects at CRDC and trained thousands of peacebuilders in Afghanistan, Iran, Syria, Palestine and Israel on strategies to address complex conflicts. He studies dilemmas of values in global conflicts and diverse contexts where religion and culture play a crucial role in conflicts and conflict resolution.

Gopin's particular emphasis is on the role of religion and culture in not only key to conflict, but is critical to reaching lasting resolution between peoples and nations. Widely recognized for his lectures and training on peacemaking strategies, Gopin has worked in Ireland, Israel, India, Switzerland, and Italy, and has presented at Harvard, Yale, Columbia, and Princeton Universities. He has also engaged in back channel diplomacy with religious, political, and military figures on both sides of entrenched conflicts, especially in the Israel-Palestine conflict, Jordan, and Syria

Education
Gopin got his B.A. in European Intellectual History from Columbia College in 1979. In 1983, Gopin was ordained as a rabbi at Yeshiva University, where he was a student of Rabbi Joseph Soloveitchik.  He received his M.A. from Brandeis University in 1988 where he also got his PhD in 1992 from the Department of Near Eastern and Judaic Studies. His dissertation Topic: The Religious Ethics of Samuel David Luzzatto.

Published Works
Gopin, Marc (2016). Healing the Heart of Conflict: Eight Crucial Steps to Making Peace with Yourself and with Others Revised and Updated. Create Space Independent Publishing Platform. . 
 

Changing Course: A New Direction for US Relations with the Muslim World, co-author and member of Leadership Group (US Muslim Engagement Project, Washington DC, Cambridge, MA, September 2008)

"Judaism and Peacebuilding in Religion and Peacebuilding, Albany: State University of New York Press, 2004

Gopin, Marc (2001). Religion and International Relations at the Crossroads. International Studies Review, 3(3), 157–160. 

Gopin, Marc (1998). An Orthodox Embrace of Gentiles? Interfaith Tolerance in the Thought of S. D. Luzzatto and E. Benamozegh. Modern Judaism, 18(2), 173–195.

References

External links
 Marc Gopin's Blog
 Marc Gopin bio
 School for Conflict Analysis and Resolution
 Center for World Religions, Diplomacy and Conflict Resolution

George Mason University faculty
Peace and conflict scholars
Brandeis University alumni
Dispute resolution
Living people
Year of birth missing (living people)